Les McCann Plays the Hits is an album by pianist Les McCann recorded in 1966 and released on the Limelight label.

Reception

AllMusic gives the album 3 stars.

Track listing 
 "Sunny (part 1)" (Bobby Hebb) – 7:07
 "Sunny (part 2)" (Hebb) – 2:40
 "Guantanamera" (José Martí) – 2:55
 "Summer Samba (So Nice)" (Marcos Valle, Paulo Sérgio Valle, Norman Gimbel) – 2:22
 "Sad Little Girl" (Les McCann) – 2:55
 "River Deep – Mountain High" (Jeff Barry, Ellie Greenwich, Phil Spector) – 3:16
 "Les Skate" (Jerry Ross, Mark Barkan) – 3:19 	
 "Sunshine Superman" (Donovan) – 3:06 
 "Message to Michael" (Burt Bacharach, Hal David) – 2:52
 "Flamingo" (Ted Grouya, Edmund Anderson) – 2:35 	
 "Compared to What" (Gene McDaniels) – 2:33
 "Pretty Flamingo" (Barkan) – 3:17

Personnel 
Les McCann – piano, vocals
Seldon Powell – tenor saxophone, flute (tracks 1, 3, 4 & 7–12)
Plas Johnson (tracks 2, 5 & 6), Jerome Richardson (tracks 1, 3, 4 & 7–12) – tenor saxophone 
Lynn Blessing (tracks 2, 5 & 6), Warren Chiasson (tracks 1, 3, 4 & 7–12) – vibraphone 
Vincent Bell (tracks 1, 3, 4 & 7–12), Jimmy Georgantones (tracks 2, 5 & 6), Carl Lynch (tracks 1, 3, 4 & 7–12) – guitar
Leroy Vinnegar – bass
Joe Macho – Fender bass (tracks 1, 3, 4 & 7–12)
Booker T. Robinson – drums
Johnny Pacheco (tracks 1, 3, 4 & 7–12), Ron Rich (tracks 2, 5 & 6) – congas

References 

Les McCann albums
1966 albums
Limelight Records albums